The Lienchiang County Hospital is a hospital in Nangan Township, Lienchiang County, Taiwan.

History
The hospital was originally established as Matsu Health Bureau in 1956. In July 1993, it was renamed Lienchiang County Hospital and belonged to Lienchiang County Health Bureau. The new medical building was completed in January 2001 with a total capacity of 50 beds.

Departments
The hospital consists of internal medicine, surgery, pediatrics, obstetrics and gynecology, ophthalmology, rehabilitation, dentistry, nursing, medical laboratory diagnosis, pharmacy, and medical imaging departments.

See also
 List of hospitals in Taiwan

References

External links
 

1956 establishments in Taiwan
Buildings and structures in Lienchiang County
Hospitals established in 1956
Hospitals in Taiwan
Nangang Township